Anthony Devon Pleasant (born January 27, 1968) is an American former professional American football player and assistant coach. A 6'5", 280-lb. defensive end from Tennessee State University, Pleasant was selected by the Cleveland Browns in the third round of the 1990 NFL Draft and played in 14 NFL seasons from 1990 to 2004 for the Browns, Baltimore Ravens, Atlanta Falcons, New York Jets, San Francisco 49ers, and New England Patriots. In his career, Pleasant appeared in 202 games and recorded 58.0 sacks with 2 interceptions.

Pleasant spent the last three years of his career with the Patriots and won two Super Bowls with the team (XXXVI and XXXVIII). He retired following the latter.

After his playing career, Pleasant served as the assistant defensive coach for the NFL's Kansas City Chiefs and Houston Texans.

Coaching career
Assistant defensive coach for the Kansas City Chiefs from 2010 to 2012. Kansas City Chiefs.

Assistant strength and conditioning coach in 2014 for the Houston Texans. Assistant defensive coach in 2015 for the Houston Texans.

References

Cleveland Browns players
Baltimore Ravens players
Atlanta Falcons players
New York Jets players
San Francisco 49ers players
New England Patriots players
Tennessee State Tigers football players
American football defensive ends
American football defensive tackles
1968 births
Living people
Kansas City Chiefs coaches
Players of American football from Florida
People from Century, Florida
Ed Block Courage Award recipients